Rauris is a municipality in Salzburg (state) in the area of Pinzgau in Austria. There are about 3,150 inhabitants living in Rauris.

Geography 
The market town Rauris is located in the Pinzgau in the state Salzburg at the river Rauriser Ache at the bottom of the Sonnblick group in the heart of the Nationalpark Hohe Tauern.  Rauris is the largest municipal area of the province of Salzburg.

Bucheben, Fröstlberg, Grub, Hundsdorf, Marktrevier, Rauris, Seidlwinkl, Unterland, Vorstanddorf, Vorstandrevier, Wörth and Wörtherberg are all within the municipal area of Rauris.

History

Overview of historic development 

The valley of Rauris is one of the lesser valleys in the Tauern that is permanently populated.  Archeological findings show that these passes were used by ancient people near the Rauriser Tauern (Hochtor). A gilt neck-ring was found on the Maschlalm which originated from the time of La Tène in about 400 B.C. In the centre of Rauris six silver-coins were found, of which three show the head of Philip II of Macedon, who reigned 360 to 336 B.C. on the Balkan.

Further findings are a small Hercules-statue from Roman-times, a bronze-sword from 1300 B.C., older than a scarab discovered from the time of Ramses II in about 1200 B.C.

The settlement 
The valley was first settled in the south. This began with the founding of Schwaigen in the 12th century. The present-day place of Rauris was named after the Gaisbach earlier. It was first mentioned in 1120. The name "Rurise" appeared for the first time in 1122, when Bishop Heinrich of Freising handed over two yards to his brother Count Friedrich of Peilstein, and marked the whole valley.

Rauris as a resting point 
By 1230, Wörth was an important resting point for people and vehicles passing south over the Tauern (Seidlwinkl) to the mining-area in (Hüttwinkl).

The valley of Seidlwinkl was the eastern gateway to the Tauern (Hochtor), its advantage being that it could be open for longer. The importance of the valley led to the construction of the original Rauriser Tauernhaus that gave shelter and warmth to passing tradesmen. Much like the existing pass houses in other valleys. The Rauriser Tauernhaus got the right to sell drinks in 1491.

Construction of the church in Rauris 
In 1203 the delighted Chrysant of Einöd constructed a chapel in honour of St. Michael. In 1339, the reconstruction of the church was applied for and in just 15 years was completed. In documents from 1411, it has been discovered that the church was reconstructed once again. However, there has only been a consecrated and independent parish of Rauris since 1858. The parish-church of Rauris is called the Church of Saint Martin and Saint James.

Gold-mining 
The valley gained providence and wealth through gold-mining. From 1377 to 1802, Rauris held an independent country and mountain-court. Mining reached its peak from the 15th to 16th centuries. The houses of the mine-workers still testify to the affluence of this time with bow-gates and bay windows. By 1500, the valley had more than 3.000 inhabitants.

Construction of the weather station 
Gold-operator Ignaz Rojacher, who lived in the 19th century, built the weather station on Sonnblick (3.105m / 10.687 feet) in 1886 as a worldwide first and the then most highly situated meteorological observation station.

The cable car which supplied the weather station on Sonnblick was completed in 1954. Until then, everything which was required had to be carried from the valley to the summit.

The 20th century 
After gold-mining almost came to a complete end at the beginning of the 20th century in Raurisertal, attempts were made to try and revive the industry.

However, at the beginning of talks within the Rauris community, proposals to recreate the industry were rejected in fear that it could damage the environment and the region's tourism prospects.

The Town 
In 1478, the name "market town" was used as a title for Rauris. This was confirmed in 1884 by Emperor Franz Josef and again in 1928 more recently.

In 1732, 166 Protestants had to leave the Raurisertal during the Protestant-expulsion.

Politics 

 1971–1974 Siegfried Rasser (ÖVP)
 1974–1984 Anton Altenhuber (ÖVP)
 1984–1989 Otto Kaiserer (ÖVP)
 1989–2014 Robert Reiter (ÖVP)
 2014–current Peter Loitfellner (SPÖ)

Economy and infrastructure 
Rauris is a popular tourist destination with over 420.000 overnight stays each year.

Rauris Hochalmbahnen

Rauris is home to a ski resort within walking distance from the town center. The resort offers up to 32 kilometers and ten lifts, including three gondolas and a chairlift.

Notable people  
 Ulrike Maier, two-time Super-G World Alpine Ski Champion
 Ignaz Rojacher, mine-operator
 Reinhard Schwabenitzky, director

Climate
The Köppen Climate Classification sub-type for this climate is "Dfb" (Warm Summer Continental Climate).

See also 

 Salzburgerland
 Salzburg

References

External links 

www.rauris.net - community web

Cities and towns in Zell am See District
Glockner Group
Goldberg Group